Martín Alund and Guido Pella were the defending champions but decided not to participate.
Nicolás Barrientos and Eduardo Struvay defeated Facundo Bagnis and Federico Delbonis 3–6, 6–3, [10–6] in the final to win the title.

Seeds

Draw

Draw

References
 Main Draw

Seguros Bolivar Open Pereira - Doubles
2013 Doubles